The Iraq Solidarity Campaign was founded in 2003 and is led by British-born Iraqi writer Hussein Al-Alak. The group is active in protests against the Iraqi invasion and occupying in different locations throughout the world.

The reports of the Iraq Solidarity Campaign are regular features in the international media, with statements and articles having been published by various magazines including the UN Observer, Uruknet, the Global Research Institute, Palestine Chronicle, the London Progressive Journal and the Association of Muslim Scholars in Iraq. 

They also run the Iraqi Solidarity News (Al-Thawra), which is the online magazine of the Campaign and is not connected to the Al-Thawra news agency of either the Syrian or Iraqi Baath Parties. 

In 2007, Iraq Solidarity initiated "In Defence of Iraqs Palestinians", which was an almagmation of over eighteen international organisations, including Al-Awda: the Palestinian Right to Return Coalition. This was aimed at drawing international attention to the ethnic cleansing of Palestinians in Iraq but also helped to provide aid to displaced Palestinians along the borders with Iraq.  

In 2008, the ISC also participated in the US elections by endorsing the Party for Socialism and Liberation and their slate of candidates which included Gloria La Riva for President and Eugene Puryear for Vice President. The Campaign also helped other US candidates in the elections, who were standing on social justice tickets, including that of US soldier and anti-war campaigner Michael Prysner.   

Prior to the 2003 invasion, the organisation operated as the Coalition Against Sanctions and War on Iraq (CASWI), which formed as a result of a fusion between organisations which included the Campaign Against Repression and for Democratic Rights in Iraq (CARDRI), CND, Pax Christi and some Iraqi Opposition organisations.

The Campaign Against Repression and for Democratic Rights in Iraq was founded in 1979 and obtained the support of organisations including the Iraqi Women's League, the Iraqi Communist Party and was chaired by the current Special Human Rights Envoy to Iraq, Ann Clwyd MP.

References
http://iraq-solidarity.blogspot.co.uk/ Iraqi Solidarity News (Al-Thawra) 

Anti–Iraq War groups
Political advocacy groups in the United Kingdom